Seas Beneath is a 1931 American Pre-Code action film directed by John Ford and starring George O'Brien and Marion Lessing.

In the book, John Ford by Peter Bogdanovich, Ford was interviewed about his memories of directing the film, and he had the following to say about the experience, expressing his annoyance at Lessing being hired as a leading actress:

Cast
 George O'Brien as Cmdr. Robert "Bob" Kingsley
 Marion Lessing as Anna Marie Von Steuben
 Mona Maris as Fraulein Lolita
 Walter C. Kelly as Chief Mike "Guns" Costello
 Warren Hymer as "Lug" Kaufman
 Steve Pendleton as Ens. Richard "Dick" Cabot 
 Walter McGrail as Chief Joe Cobb
 Larry Kent as Lt. "Mac" McGregor
 Henry Victor as Baron Ernst von Steuben 
 John Loder as Franz Shiller
 Maurice Murphy as Merkel (uncredited)
 Harry Tenbrook as Winkler (uncredited)

References

External links

1931 films
1930s action films
American black-and-white films
American spy films
American action films
American war drama films
Films directed by John Ford
Fox Film films
Films with screenplays by Dudley Nichols
World War I submarine films
1930s English-language films
1930s American films